Joe Fagaofe Salave'a (born March 23, 1975) is an American football coach and former defensive tackle who is currently the associate head coach, run game coordinator and defensive line coach at the University of Miami. He previously served as the associate head coach, defensive line coach and co-defensive coordinator at the University of Oregon from 2017 to 2021.  

Salave'a played college football at the University of Arizona and was drafted by the Tennessee Oilers in the fourth round of the 1998 NFL Draft. He played for nine seasons in the NFL with the Tennessee Oilers / Titans, Baltimore Ravens, San Diego Chargers and Washington Redskins. Following the end of his playing career, Salave’a began coaching at San Jose State University as a defensive line coach in 2008. Since then, he has coached at the University of Arizona, Washington State University and the University of Oregon.

Early life
Joe Salave’a attended Widefield High School,located in Widefield, CO, 1990. Salave'a moved to Oceanside, California near San Diego, in 1991, and graduated from Oceanside High School.

Playing career

College
Salave'a attended and played college football at the University of Arizona.  In football, he was a three-year starter and a two-time All-Pacific-10 Conference selection.

National Football League

Tennessee Oilers / Titans
Salave'a was drafted by the Tennessee Oilers in the 1998 NFL Draft and would spend five seasons with Tennessee. In 1999, the Titans made it to Super Bowl XXXIV in which Salave'a appeared as a substitute, however they lost to the Kurt Warner-led St. Louis Rams.

Baltimore Ravens
In 2003, Salave'a was signed by the Baltimore Ravens.

San Diego Chargers
In 2003, Salave'a was signed by the San Diego Chargers and spent one season with the Chargers.

Washington Redskins
In 2004, Salave’a signed with the Washington Redskins. Playing primarily as a backup, Salave'a had a breakthrough year in 2004, registering 30 tackles and two sacks for the second-ranked Redskins defense. In 2005, he started 13 games and had 50 tackles, a half-sack, a forced fumble and a fumble recovery, helping to lead the Redskins to their first playoff appearance of the decade.

Salave'a was released by the Redskins on August 28, 2007.

Coaching career

San Jose State
In April 2008, Salave'a began his coaching career at San Jose State University as their defensive line coach by his under head coach Dick Tomey.

Arizona
When Rich Rodriguez was hired as head coach at Arizona for the 2012 season, Salave'a was not retained.

Washington State
In 2012, Salave'a joined Washington State University as their defensive line coach under head coach Mike Leach. Salave’a was later promoted to assistant head coach and defensive line coach.

Oregon
In January 2017, Salave'a was hired as the associate head coach, defensive line coach and co-defensive coordinator at the University of Oregon under head coach Mario Cristobal.

Miami
On January 7, 2022, Salave'a was hired as the associate head coach, run game coordinator and defensive line coach at the University of Miami following head coach Mario Cristobal.

Personal life
Salave'a's older brother, Okland Salave'a, played football at Colorado from 1987–1989.  Salave'a also has his own foundation—the Joe Salave'a foundation.

References

1975 births
Living people
Washington Redskins players
American football defensive tackles
American sportspeople of Samoan descent
Arizona Wildcats football players
Players of American football from San Diego
San Diego Chargers players
Tennessee Oilers players
Tennessee Titans players
Players of American football from American Samoa
Sportspeople from Oceanside, California
San Jose State Spartans football coaches
Arizona Wildcats football coaches
Washington State Cougars football coaches
Oregon Ducks football coaches
Coaches of American football from California